South Park is a geologic flat in Saguache County, Colorado near Houselog Creek and  north of Mount Lion at Saguache County Road 33Aa.

References

Geography of Saguache County, Colorado
Geology of Colorado